Katerine Ruth Tisalema Puruncaja (born 28 July 1996) is an Ecuadorian long-distance runner. In 2020, she competed in the women's half marathon at the 2020 World Athletics Half Marathon Championships held in Gdynia, Poland.

References

External links 
 

Living people
1996 births
Place of birth missing (living people)
Ecuadorian female long-distance runners
21st-century Ecuadorian women